Sara Reva Horowitz (born 1951) is an American Holocaust literary scholar. She is a professor of Comparative Literature and Humanities and former Director of the Israel and Golda Koschitzky Centre for Jewish Studies at York University. She is also a member of the academic advisory board of the United States Holocaust Memorial Museum.

Education
Horowitz earned her Master of Arts from Columbia University. In 1982, she was the recipient of a Mary Isabel Sibley Fellowship from Phi Beta Kappa. Horowitz then earned her PhD from Brandeis University.

Career

In 1992, Horowitz and Rabbi Gilah Langner founded a Jewish journal "Kerem: A Journal of Creative Explorations in Judaism." As an associate professor at the University of Delaware, Horowitz also directed its Jewish Studies Program. In 1995, Horowitz co-edited "Jewish American Women Writers" which won the 1995 Judaica Reference Book Award. Two years later, she wrote Voicing the Void: Muteness and Memory in Holocaust Fiction which won the 1997 Choice: Current Reviews for Academic Libraries. She also received the University of Delaware CHOICE award. In 2000, Horowitz left the University of Delaware and moved to Canada. She also published "Gender, Genocide, and Jewish Memory."

In 2002, Horowitz was appointed a full-time associate professor at York University in their Faculty of Liberal Arts & Professional Studies. The following year, she was the recipient of a $97,086 grant to study Gender and the Holocaust. She was also elected vice president of the Association for Jewish Studies. In 2005, Horowitz was named Director of the Israel and Golda Koschitzky Centre for Jewish Studies at York University.

Horowitz collaborated with Julia Creet and Amira Dan to edit H. G. Adler: Life, Literature, Legacy which won the 2016 Canadian Jewish Literary Award for the best contribution to Jewish thought and culture. She later sat on the jury of the 2019 Canadian Jewish Literary Awards.

She also sits on the Academic Advisory Committee of the United States Holocaust Memorial Museum, as well as the advisory board of the Remember the Women Institute

Selected publications
Voicing the void: muteness and memory in Holocaust fiction
Women in Holocaust literature: Engendering trauma memory
But is it Good for the Jews? Spielberg's Schindler and the Aesthetics of Atrocity
Gender, Genocide, and Jewish Memory
Memory and Testimony of Women Survivors of Nazi Genocide
Engaging survivors: Assessing 'testimony' and 'trauma' as foundational concepts
The gender of good and evil: Women and Holocaust memory
Nostalgia and the Holocaust
Mengele, the Gynecologist, and Other Stories of Women's Survival
The cinematic triangulation of Jewish American identity: Israel, America and the Holocaust
Gender and Holocaust representation

References 

Living people
Columbia University alumni
Brandeis University alumni
Academic staff of York University
American women historians
Historians of the Holocaust
20th-century American historians
20th-century American women writers
21st-century American historians
21st-century American women writers
1951 births